This is a list of accidents and incidents involving Douglas DC-3 variants that occurred in the year 1955, including aircraft based on the DC-3 airframe, such as the Douglas C-47 Skytrain and Lisunov Li-2. Military accidents are included; and hijackings and incidents of terrorism are covered, although acts of war are outside the scope of this list.

January
January 12: A Castleton Inc. C-47 (N999B) collided in mid-air with TWA Flight 694, a Martin 2-0-2A, over Cincinnati, Ohio, killing all 15 on board both aircraft.
January 13: Aeroflot Flight 31 (an Li-2, CCCP-L5000) crashed near Bykovo due to engine failure, killing the five crew; the aircraft was operating a Moscow-Gorky-Sverdlovsk cargo service.
January 21: An Indian Airlines C-47A (VT-COZ) struck trees and crashed at Guwahati, India, killing the three crew. The aircraft was operating a Calcutta-Guwahati cargo service.
January 23: Aeroflot Flight 613 (an Li-2, CCCP-L4510) crashed near Lipovets, Kagarlyksky district due to an in-flight fire, killing three of 13 on board. The aircraft was operating a Kiev-Simferpol passenger service. The aircraft had been converted at ARB-411 from a cargo to a combi configuration, but during the conversion, the construction deviated from the standard at ARB-402; the cabin insulation was not fireproof and the ventilation system was not properly assembled. A crew member threw a lit cigarette out the right side cockpit window and it landed inside the ventilation intake; sparks from the cigarette ignited the insulation, starting the fire.

February
February 2: An Indian Airlines C-47A (VT-CVB) crashed at Nagpur, India due to pilot error, killing all 10 on board. The aircraft was operating a Nagpur-Delhi passenger/mail service. 
February 23: Central African Airways Flight 626, a C-47B (VP-YKO), overran the runway at Salisbury Airport after smoke entered the cockpit; the number one propeller broke off and penetrated the fuselage, killing the flight engineer; all 21 passengers and four remaining crew survived. The cause of the smoke was traced to a leaking oil hose on the number one engine.

March
March 6: A REAL Transportes Aereos DC-3A (PP-YPZ) crashed at Vitoria da Conquista Airport following an overshoot due to landing gear problems, killing five of 21 on board. 
March 8: Mexicana Flight 591, a Douglas DC-3A-228D (XA-DIK), crashed in the Cerro del Cabre mountain range, killing all 26 on board. 
March 9: An Avianca C-47A (HK-328) struck Cerro Trujillo, killing all eight on board; the wreckage was found four days later.

April
April 2: A GUSMP Li-2 (CCCP-N497) crashed on landing near Mys Zhelaniya after the landing gear broke through the ice; all 10 on board were able to escape, but the aircraft could not be recovered and sank four days later during a storm.

May
May 8: Aeroflot Flight 599 (an Li-2, CCCP-L4098) crashed near Dnepropetrovsk due to wing separation caused by improper maintenance, killing the four crew. The aircraft was operating a Kiev-Dnepropetrovsk-Zaporozhye cargo service.
May 18: East African Airways Flight 104, a C-47B (VP-KKH) struck Mount Kilimanjaro due to weather and pilot error, killing all 20 on board; the wreckage was found four days later. The accident remains the worst in Tanzania.
May 26: A GUSMP Li-2 (CCCP-N535) crashed on an ice floe in the central Arctic basin after the right side landing gear struck an ice hummock and broke; the nose touched the ice and the fuselage then split in three after falling back on the ice. All 10 on board survived and were evacuated by another aircraft; the wreckage was set on fire and abandoned. The wreckage was sighted by the Icelandic Coast Guard on December 11, 1959.

June
June 25: Two Indian Air Force C-47's collided in mid-air near Agra, India, killing all 19 on board both aircraft.

August
August 26: A Cruzeiro do Sul DC-3A (PP-CBY) struck a mountain in the Serra do Costelo due to ATC error, pilot error and an incorrect chart, killing all 13 on board.

September
September 8: A Currey Air Transport R4D-1 (N74663) crashed at Lockheed Air Terminal while attempting an emergency landing following engine failure, killing three of 33 on board.
September 28: Aeroflot Flight 349 (an Li-2, CCCP-L4712) crashed near Borovichy due to engine failure and radio problems, killing seven of 19 on board.

November
November 5: A Mexican Government C-47A (XC-ABW) crashed in Lake Texcoco due to engine failure, killing four of 17 on board; the aircraft was rebuilt in the United States and re-registered N1369N; it was then sold to the Brazilian Air Force as FAB2065.

December
December 9: Aeroflot Flight 976 (an Li-2, CCCP-L4993) disappeared while operating a Yuzhno-Sakhalinsk-Khabarovsk service; the aircraft was found on December 21 on Mount Tordoki Yani, Khabarovsk. All 20 on board died; ATC errors and weather were blamed.
December 9: Aeroflot Flight 101 (an Li-2, CCCP-L4339) crashed in the Tyumen region due to spatial disorientation of the crew, killing seven of nine on board. The aircraft was operating a Moscow-Petropavlovsk-Sverdlovsk-Ust-Kamenogorsk passenger service.
December 21: Aeroflot Flight 90 (an Li-2, CCCP-L4981) disappeared while operating an Alma-Ata-Balkhash-Moscow cargo service; the aircraft was found two days later in a snowy desert 105 km from Balkhash. All six on board died; a faulty gyroscope caused by a design flaw and improper maintenance was blamed.
December 22: A Manx Airlines C-47 (G-AMZC) was being ferried from Isle of Man to Düsseldorf when it struck trees and crashed near Düsseldorf Airport due to pilot error, killing the three crew.

See also
List of accidents and incidents involving the DC-3 in the 1950s

References

1955
DC-3